Lyctus villosus is a species of powder-post beetle in the family Bostrichidae. It is found in the Caribbean Sea, Central America, North America, Oceania, and South America.

References

Further reading

 
 
 

Bostrichidae
Articles created by Qbugbot
Beetles described in 1911